The jurisdiction of the university extended originally to the states of Meghalaya and Nagaland and the erstwhile Union Territories of Arunachal Pradesh and Mizoram. With the establishment of the Nagaland University on 6 September 1994, the jurisdiction of NEHU ceased over Nagaland. Likewise with the establishment of the Mizoram University the jurisdiction of NEHU over Mizoram also ceased from June, 2001. Arunachal Pradesh has its own university.

At present there are fifty-three undergraduate colleges affiliated to the university including eight professional colleges.

List of colleges affiliated to NEHU
Loyola College, Williamnagar -Arts & Commerce
St. Edmund's College, Shillong - Arts, Science & Commerce
St. Anthony's College, Shillong - Arts, Science & Commerce
Lady Keane College, Shillong Arts & Science 
Saint Mary's College (Shillong) - Arts, Commerce & Science
Union Christian College, Meghalaya - Arts & Science
Shillong College, Shillong - Arts, Science & Commerce 
Tura Government College, Tura - Arts, Science & Commerce
Sankardev College, Shillong - Arts & Science  
College of Teacher Education (PGT), Shillong - B.Ed.
Shillong Law College, Shillong - L.L.B.
Synod College, Shillong - Arts & Science  
 Kiang Nangbah Government College, Jowai - Arts & Science  
 Mendipathar College, Mendipathar, East Garo Hills, Meghalaya - Arts 
Seng Khasi College, Shillong - Arts
Tura Law College, Tura - Law
Nongstoin College, Nongstoin - Arts
Acheng Rangmanpa College, Mahendraganj - Arts and Science
Raid Laban College, Shillong - Arts, Science & Commerce
Ri-Bhoi College, Nongpoh - Arts
Sngap Syiem College, Mawkyrwat - Arts
Sohra Government College, Cherrapunjee - Arts
Khad-Ar-Doloi Law College, Jowai - L.L.B.
Shillong Commerce College, Shillong - Commerce
Don Bosco College, Tura - Arts & Science
Tirot Sing Memorial College, Mairang - Arts
Women's College, Shillong - Arts
Tikrikilla College, Tikrikilla W.Garo Hills - Arts
Kazi & Zaman College, New Bhaitbari, W.Garo Hills - Arts
Nongtalang College, Nongtalang, West Jaintia Hills - Arts
Jaintia Eastern College, Khliehriat, East Jaintia Hills - Arts
Bor Manik College, 3rd Mile, Upper Shillong, Shillong-5 - Arts
Durama College, Tura - Arts
Greater Mawlai College, Mawlai, Shillong - Arts
College of Teacher Education, Rongkhon, Tura - B.Ed.
Budha Bhanu Saraswati College, Mawprem, Shillong - Arts, Commerce
Morning Star College, Nongthymmai, Shillong - Arts
Capt. Williamson Memorial College, Badgmara, W.Garo Hills - Arts
Umshyrpi College, Laban, Shillong - Arts
Bissau College, Midland, Compound Jowai Road, Shillong - Arts & Science
Thomas Jones Synod College, Jaintia Hills - Arts
Mawsynram Border Area College, Nongkhlaw, Mawsynram, Meghalaya - Arts
St. Dominic College, Dum Dum, Nongthymmai, Shillong - Arts
Nabon Synod College, Jowai - Arts
Northeast Adventist College, Jowai - Arts
Shillong Engineering and Management College, Laitumkhrah, Shillong - Engineering & Management
Alpine College, Nongthymmai, Shillong
Goodwill College, Nongthymmai, Shillong
St. Mary's College of Teacher Education, Laitumkhrah, Shillong
Ramsang College, Williamnagar
Williamnagar College, Williamnagar
Christian Academy College, Pynthorbah, Shillong
Mawlai Presby. College, Mawlai Iewrynghep, Shillong
Phukan M. College, Dalu, West Garo Hills
K. L. Bajoria College, Boyce Road, Shillong. - Arts & Commerce
Don Bosco College of Teacher Education, Tura
College of Nursing, NEIGRIHMS, Mawdiangdiang
Mairang Presby. College, Mairang, West Khasi Hills
Nabon Synod College, Jaiaw, Shillong - Arts
North- East Adventist College, Thadlaskein Jowai - Arts
Shillong Engineering & Management College, Jorabat, Ri-Bhoi Dist. - Engineering & Management
Alpine College, Nongthymmai, Shillong – Arts & Commerce
Goodwill College, Nongthymmai Shillong – Arts
St. Mary's College Of Teacher Education, Laitumkhrah, Shillong - B.Ed.
Ramsang College, Williamnagar, E.G.H. - Arts
Williamnagar College, Williamnagar – Arts
Christian Academy College, Riatsamthiah, Shillong – Arts
Mawlai Presbyterian College, Mawlai Nongkwar, Shillong - Arts
Phukan M. College, Dalu, W.G.H. - Arts
K.L. Bajoria College, Boyce Road, Shillong – Arts & Commerce
Don Bosco College Of Teacher Education, Tura – B.Ed.
St. Peter's College, Shillong - Arts, Science & Commerce
College Of Nursing, NEIGRIHMS, Mawdiangdiang, Shillong – B.Sc. (Nursing)
Mairang Presbyterian Science College, Mairang, W.K.H.- Science
Regional College Of Higher Education, Dispur, Guwahati - B. Sc.Biochem., BBA, BCA, B.Sc., Biotech.
Ampati College, Ampati W.G.H. - Arts
NEIGRIHMS, Mawdiangdiang, Shillong - MBBS
Khrawsing Christian College, Mawngap, Mawphlang, E.K.H. – Arts
Sowlyngdoh College, Mowkaiaw, Jaintia Hills –Arts
Nongrum College, Zekabari, W.G.H. – 794105 - Arts

NEHU
North-Eastern Hill University